Ae Watan is an Indian patriotic Hindi song from the soundtrack of the 2018 Bollywood film Raazi. The song is sung by Arijit Singh and Sunidhi Chauhan. Shankar–Ehsaan–Loy composed the music, and Gulzar and Allama Iqbal wrote the lyrics. The music video for the song stars Sehmat Khan (played by Alia Bhatt).

The song was praised for "delivering patriotism" by multiple critics. Gulzar has expressed his belief that Ae Watan should become "the song of our nation". The song won the IIFA Award for Playback Singer (Male and Female) at the 2019 International Indian Film Academy Awards.

Development 
Raazi features four songs. Both "Ae Watan" and "Dilbaro" serve as the title tracks for the film. Ehsaan Noorani of the musical trio Shankar–Ehsaan–Loy described the song as being "crucial to the story". Shankar Mahadevan of the same trio, talking about the song, told The Times of India,

Lyricist Gulzar has said he wants the song to become "the song of our nation". In an interview with The Times of India, Gulzar explains: "It speaks for all of us and it speaks without any prejudice. People keep asking what nationalism is all about. Well, one can define nationalism through this song". Gulzar later stated that the song is a tribute to the poet Muhammad Iqbal.

Music video 
The music video features actress Alia Bhatt as Sehmat Khan, explaining why she choose to become a spy for India.

Reception

Critical response 
Writing for The Hindu, Vipin Nair praised the song, calling it the first "patriotic song to have come out of Bollywood in a long time". Firstpost, an Indian news and media website, wrote: "'Ae Watan' celebrates the true spirit of patriotism – where one places one's motherland before anything, even oneself". Sankhayan Ghosh of the Film Companion expressed that the song "stands out for its simplicity, and context". He further added "Ae Watan appeals to the hardened cynics from both sides of the ideological centre; it reminds us that patriotism isn't necessarily a bad thing, all the while showing the price we pay for it". Priyanka Vartak of The Free Press Journal wrote that: "[Arijit Singh] his soulful voice will surely give you goosebumps".

Popular reception
Ehsaan Noorani commented that people upload "at least two-three cover versions" of the song via social media platforms. He further added that the song has "achieved a different level of popularity" and he has never "seen reactions" like this before.

Chart performance

Accolades

References

External links 
 

2018 songs
Songs written for films
Hindi film songs
Arijit Singh songs
Sunidhi Chauhan songs